Philip Beard (born 1963) is an American novelist.

He was educated at Colgate University and the University of Pittsburgh School of Law.

Works
 Dear Zoe, a novel (New York: Viking, 2005)
 Lost in the Garden, a novel (New York: Viking, 2006)
 "Swing", a novel (New York: Van Buren, 2015)

Sources
Contemporary Authors Online. The Gale Group, 2006. PEN (Permanent Entry Number):  0000162696.

External links
  Philip Beard webpage

1963 births
Living people
21st-century American novelists
Writers from Pittsburgh
University of Pittsburgh School of Law alumni
Colgate University alumni
American male novelists
21st-century American male writers
Novelists from Pennsylvania